The Ocean County Mall is a super-regional mall, opened On July 20, 1976, by Edward J. DeBartolo Corporation, located in Toms River, New Jersey on Hooper Avenue (County Route 549). The mall is accessible from Exit 82 of the Garden State Parkway via Route 37 East. The mall is managed by Simon Property Group.

The mall is anchored by Boscov's, JCPenney, and Macy's. The center went under development in 2019 bringing a slew of national retail and restaurant tenants like ULTA Beauty, On The Border, P.F. Chang's, HomeSense and more. It also contains several eateries, and a small food court. The Ocean County Mall is the only enclosed mall in Ocean County. It is a popular destination for tourists in the Toms River area during the summer season.

History
In the 1970s, the Toms River area, although growing quickly, was still relatively rural. The closest malls were the Monmouth Mall in Eatontown, and the Shore Mall in Egg Harbor. With the growing need for an enclosed mall, the mall was originally planned to be at the intersection of Route 37 and the Garden State Parkway. However, the mall opened On July 20, 1976, at its current location at Hooper Avenue and Bay Avenue, with three anchors (Sears, JCPenney and Bamberger's, now Macy's) and a cinema (General Cinema, now replaced by a Japanese restaurant).

In 1988, a small expansion was built which included a Stern's. When the chain went out of business, it was turned into Boscov's. Around the same time, the General Cinema quietly closed down due to competition from the AMC-Loews across the street at Seacourt Pavilion. The Cinema's main mall entrance near Applebee's was sealed off for years (now a Japanese restaurant, Ichiban), while the small side hallway near Sears remained locked and dark.

In 2003, the mall received a complete renovation, which added new signage, flooring, lighting, seating areas, and lighting in the parking lot. The renovation was partially sponsored by the Deborah Heart and Lung Center, which donated seating & lounge areas, in part to encourage mall walking. To accommodate, there is a stretch of discolored tile around the perimeter of the mall with numbers engraved marking walking distance.

On January 4, 2018, it was announced that the Sears would be closing in early April of that year as part of a plan to close 103 stores nationwide.

Sears closed on April 8, 2018. Simon redeveloped  the space to include more retail, restaurants, and fitness by 2020. Its one of the five malls owned by Simon that had Sears closed planned to be redeveloped. In January 2020, LA Fitness opened in part of the Sears space. Five Below opened in July 2020. In September 2020, Ulta Beauty opened. HomeSense opened in December 2020.

Anchors 

 Macy's - 2 floors, formerly Bamberger's
 Boscov's - 2 floors, formerly Stern's
 JCPenney - 2 floors, original anchor
Homesense 1 Floor
LA Fitness 1 Floor
Five Below 1 Floor
Ulta Beauty 1 Floor

References

External links
 International Council of Shopping Centers: Ocean County Mall

Toms River, New Jersey
Shopping malls in New Jersey
Simon Property Group
Shopping malls established in 1976
Buildings and structures in Ocean County, New Jersey
Tourist attractions in Ocean County, New Jersey
Shopping malls in the New York metropolitan area